Samuel Sezak (May 30, 1906 – March 21, 1989) was an American football and basketball coach.  He served the head football coach at the University of Maine for the 1943 season and compiled a 0–1 record.  Sezak was also the head basketball coach at Maine from 1942 to 1944, amassing a record of 13–12.

Head coaching record

Football

References

1906 births
1989 deaths
Maine Black Bears football coaches
Maine Black Bears men's basketball coaches